Ormayundo Ee Mukham is a 2014 Indian Malayalam-language romantic musical film written and directed by Anvar Sadik, starring Vineeth Sreenivasan and Namitha Pramod. The film features musical score by Shaan Rahman. The film released on 14 November 2014. It is inspired by the 2004 American film 50 First Dates.

Plot 
The story first shows Nithya, a sand artist doing her program. When she is on her way home, she gets into an accident, which leads to memory loss that can only allow her remember anything for just 24 hours. She keeps a diary where she jots down all her memories.

Then we meet Gautham a young businessman who also suffers from temporary memory problems. His mother get annoyed with him and asks him to marry a girl, Hema, whom he doesn't like. Angry with his mother because of this, he and his grandmother make a plan. The plan is that he will say that he is in love with another girl and the next day they are going to have a date.

The next morning he goes for a walk around the city looking for a date. He then meets Nithya and watches her sand art and memory show. They fall in love. Nithya does not write her memories of Gautham in her memory book, as she thinks if they are real soul mates then this magic will happen.

The next day they meet, but Nithya does not recognize Gautham. Then Gautham, his friend Apoorva and Nithya's sister Neetu make up plans to meet Nithya again, and at last he succeeds. He tells his mother that he loves Nithya and then brings her to his house. There they realize their love for each Other.

The next day Nithya forgets him, but reminds herself about him after reading her memory book. She then says that they can never stay together and so tears his memories from her book. They go their separate ways. Later Gautham is travelling to the US for a meeting, and he meets Neetu at the airport. She says that Nithya is fine. She then shows him the video of Nithya's program.

He sees that the pictures drawn were related to him. That moment he abandons his trip and goes to watch Nithya's show. When she sees him there, she gets draws her image of him. But when he asks her whether she remembers him, she says no. Gautham returns, and then sees his mother in the auditorium. His mother asks him to turn back. When he looks at the screen he sees Nithya drawing his face. Gautham runs back to the stage and asks her "whether she really does not know him." She replies that "even without knowing who you are I used to draw your pictures." Then they understand that even though she forgets everything after 24 hours, she will never be able to forget him as she loves him.

Then they marry and live happily ever after.

Cast 
 Vineeth Sreenivasan as Gautham, Young businessman
 Namitha Pramod as Nithya/Nithya Gautam, Sand animation artist
 Mukesh as Nithya's Doctor/ Uncle John Kuruvilla
 Aju Varghese as Apoorva, Gautham's best pal
 Soumya Sadanandan as Neethu, Nithya's Sister
 Rohini as Vasundhara Devi, Gautham's mother
 Lakshmi as Gautham's grand mother
 Muktha as Hema
 Idavela Babu as Hema's Father
 Anju Aravind as Hema's Mother
 Reena Basheer
 Raveendran as Gautham's Father
 Bhagath Manuel
 Shalini Thomas as Gautham's sister

Production 
Filming commenced in August 2014 in Kochi  and later took place at various locations including Pune, Angamaly and Alappuzha.

Soundtrack 

The film's soundtrack was composed by Shaan Rahman, Vineeth Sreenivasan's usual associate. The lyrics of these songs by Manu Manjith (Chayunnuvo, Doore Doore, Payye Payye) and Vineeth Sreenivasan The album, which was launched in late October 2014 in Kochi, features six tracks including one reprise.

The album was well received by critics and public alike.

Reception 
Akhila Menon of filmiBeat rated the film 3.5/5 and described it as "a pleasant superficial love story."
India glitz rated it 6/10. Onlookersmedia said "The newcomer Anvar had done a terrific job as a writer and director and all in all this film has become a very good entertainer for all kind of spectators."

See also 
 Mithya

References 

2014 films
Films scored by Shaan Rahman
2010s Malayalam-language films
Indian romance films
Films about amnesia
Indian remakes of American films
Malayalam films remade in other languages
2014 romance films